Withnell is a village and civil parish in the Borough of Chorley, Lancashire, England. According to the census of 2001, it had a population of 3,631, reducing to 3,498 at the census of 2011.

It constituted an urban district from 1894 to 1974. It was originally called 'Withinhull' around 1160, later appearing as 'Withinhulle' in the 1332 Subsidy Rolls of Lancashire, meaning 'a hill where willow trees grow'. It borders the villages of Brinscall and Abbey Village which are part of the parish.

Geography
Since 1966, a large number of wildflowers, native trees and heathers have been planted in the  site. The public are free to walk through the reserve.

Amenities in Withnell include St. Joseph's Catholic school and church, and St Paul's Church of England church 

There was formerly a post office, closed on 8 May 2008 as part of the Post Office Network Change Program. A newsagent continued to operate from the old post office premises, but closed a couple of years later and was converted to private housing.
There is a  GP surgery for Withnell and surrounding village, a pharmacy, beauty parlour and a car sales garage.

Withnell railway station served the village, but it closed in 1960.

In 2018, the only type of stone needed for the completion of the Basilica de la Sagrada Familia in Barcelona, Spain was discovered in the nearby Brinscall Quarry

See also
Listed buildings in Withnell

References

External links

Withnell, Chorley Borough Council.
History of Withnell Township, British History Online.
 History of Withnell Mill, Withnell history website

Geography of Chorley
Villages in Lancashire
Civil parishes in Lancashire
West Pennine Moors
Local Nature Reserves in Lancashire